Patricia Lynne "Patti" Rothberg (born May 4, 1972) is a singer-songwriter and painter.

Born in New York City, Rothberg grew up in Scarsdale, New York.

Rothberg played all the guitar and bass parts on her debut album, Between the 1 and the 9, which was released on April 2, 1996. The album went on to sell over 250,000 copies in the US and another 200,000 in Europe and Japan. The first single, "Inside", reached number 25 on the Billboard magazine Alternative chart. With her band Rothberg toured extensively supporting Chris Isaak, The Wallflowers, Garbage, Midnight Oil and Paul Westerberg; making appearances on high-profile TV shows like The Tonight Show with Jay Leno, Late Night With David Letterman and Oprah. In February 1997, Rothberg toured Europe as support to The Black Crowes.

During this time, two of Rothberg's songs appeared in film: a cover of "Kung Fu Fighting" in Beverly Hills Ninja (1997) and "Inside" in The Misadventures of Margaret (1998).

Rothberg's third album, Double Standards, was released by indie label Megaforce on May 13, 2008. The release show was at the Blender Theater in New York City on May 22, 2008.

Discography

Studio albums
 Between the 1 and the 9 (1996) – UK No. 83
 Candelabra Cadabra (2001)
 Double Standards (2008)
 Overnight Sensation (2011)
 Black Widow (2013)
Ulterior Motives (2016)
Ephemeral (2017)
 Dragon Meets Phoenix (with Sean Altman) (2018)
Behind Bars (2019)
Douche (2021)
Pizza Box (2021)

Live albums
1 & 9 Acoustic 1996 (Live) (2021)

Singles/EPs

Soundtracks
"Kung-Fu Fighting (Non-LP)" (1997) [featured on Beverly Hills Ninja Soundtrack and CMJ New Music Volume 42]
Anywhere - Original Soundtrack (2007) [7 of the 10 tracks]

References

External links
 Review of 'Candelabra Cadabra' on Page 6
 Review of 'Douche'
 Review of 'Pizza Box'

1972 births
Living people
American women singer-songwriters
Singers from New York City
Jewish American musicians
Jewish singers
Jewish rock musicians
Jewish American songwriters
People from Scarsdale, New York
Guitarists from New York City
21st-century American singers
21st-century American women singers
21st-century American guitarists
21st-century American women guitarists
21st-century American Jews
Singer-songwriters from New York (state)